Jean-Marie Clairet (born 28 October 1966 in Neuilly-sur-Seine) is a French auto racing driver.

Career 
Clairet spent the 1990s racing in various one-make Citroën championships, for the AX and Saxo in France and in Europe. In 2000 and 2001 he competed in the French Super Production Championship in a Peugeot 306. Between 2003 and 2007 he raced in one-make series for the Peugeot 206. In 2008 he began competing in the SEAT León Eurocup, finishing the championship in 7th. He continued in the Eurocup in 2009, winning a race at Brands Hatch. This won him a drive for SUNRED Engineering in the World Touring Car Championship at Oschersleben.

References

External links 
 Team Clairet Sport Official Blog 

1966 births
French racing drivers
Living people
World Touring Car Championship drivers
SEAT León Eurocup drivers
Sportspeople from Neuilly-sur-Seine